Trumpler 10 (also known as C 0846-423) is an open cluster located in the constellation Vela. It was possibly discovered by Nicolas Louis de Lacaille in 1751-52, as the cluster's location data matches well with No. II.6 in his catalog. The cluster was also officially discovered by James Dunlop in 1826 and rediscovered independently by R.J. Trumpler in 1903.

A photometric investigation was performed in 1962 which studied 29 stars within the cluster and determined 19 additional possible members.

References

External links 
SIMBAD Database page

Open clusters
Vela (constellation)
Trumpler catalog
17511231